The A41 is a trunk road between London and Birkenhead, England. Now in parts replaced by motorways, it passes through or near Watford, Kings Langley, Hemel Hempstead, Aylesbury, Bicester, Solihull, Birmingham, West Bromwich, Wolverhampton, Newport, Whitchurch, Chester and Ellesmere Port.

With the opening of the M40 extension in 1990 from junction 8, much of the route was downgraded. The sections between Bicester and the M42 near Solihull in the Midlands have been re-classified B4100,  A4177 and  A4141.

Route

London to Kings Langley 

The route begins at Marble Arch from its junction on the A40 road in London with Portman Street/Gloucester Place (northbound) and Baker Street/Orchard Street (southbound). Named the Finchley Road, the A41 is dual-carriageway through Swiss Cottage and Hendon Way and intersects with the North Circular Road near Brent Cross shopping centre. The road passes through Hendon and after the junction with the A5150, (close to the Metropolitan Police's police college and the RAF Museum). The A41 overlaps the A1 at Five Ways Corner with the section known as Watford Way. It passes through Mill Hill, separating with the A1 at Apex Corner roundabout After crossing the M1, near Elstree, it links the M1 at Junction 4, and then meets the A5 at a roundabout (where the A5 becomes the A5183). The A41 continues alongside the M1 into Hertfordshire. This section is known as Elton Way, as far as the roundabout with the B462.

Running parallel to the M1, it intersects with junction 5 (Berrygrove Interchange). The road continues north, passing over the River Colne, to the east of Watford, crossing the A412 near Garston at "the Dome roundabout". After passing under the junction with the A405, the A41 turns towards the west. At a roundabout, with the A411 to Watford to the south, and the M25 spur straight ahead to join the M25 westbound at junction 19, the A41 continues north through Hunton Bridge crossing the River Gade and the Grand Union Canal to meet the M25 at junction 20. The old route through Kings Langley is now classified A4251. It used to follow the route of the Roman road, Akeman Street, between Berkhamsted and Bicester.  The London to Aylesbury section was a similar route to the Sparrows Herne Turnpike Road.

Kings Langley to Tring 

North of the M25, the road is a near motorway standard "A" road with all junctions grade-separated via underpasses or flyovers, but curves and gradients a little steeper. There are no hard shoulders but frequent lay-bys. It climbs through the Chiltern Hills then descends into the valley of the River Bulbourne crossing water meadows just outside Hemel Hempstead at Boxmoor. There are grade-separated junctions with the A414, A4251 (the earlier route of the A41) and A416. The route returns to open country north of here, passing west of Berkhamsted. It passes the National Film Archive. Before Tring, near Wigginton, it crosses the Icknield Way Path and Chiltern Way. An arched footbridge spans the road just near the summit before it passes just east of Tring (for the Ridgeway footpath) and descends the Chiltern scarp into the Vale of Aylesbury.

The Tring bypass was built in 1973 as the first section of the Watford-Aylesbury A41(M) motorway.  On 6 July 1987, this section was downgraded to A41. The Tring bypass ends with the junction with the B4635, B4009 (the former route through Aston Clinton) and B488.

The A41 from junction 20 of the M25 to the Tring bypass was built in the early 1990s and opened in two sections: the  £23.9m Berkhamsted bypass opened September 1993 and the  £32.7m Kings Langley bypass opened August 1993.

Tring to Bicester 

On 3 October 2003, the dual carriageway section was extended to the  £25m Aston Clinton Bypass, which was originally intended to be built at the same time as the two sections further south. It enters Buckinghamshire and the district of Aylesbury Vale. It crosses the Grand Union Canal, and there is a junction with the B489, and finishes at a roundabout, becoming Aston Clinton Road. The road goes straight through Aylesbury, which is a bottleneck. It meets the A4157 at a junction as Tring Road, and the next roundabout is near Aylesbury Grammar School and a Tesco. It meets the A418 ring-road and becomes Exchange Street, then meets the A413 from Wendover at a roundabout and becomes Friarage Road, passing close to a Morrisons and the railway station. The A418 turns to the left and A41 continues straight ahead to become Gatehouse Road, then at the next roundabout, it leaves to left as Bicester Road near the Applegreen Aylesbury Service Station. After four roundabouts, it crosses the River Thame. It then meets a roundabout with access for the new Berryfields development as well as Aylesbury Vale Parkway before passing under a railway line, then through Waddesdon, then passes close to Westcott near the former airfield of RAF Westcott. At Kingswood, it passes the Crooked Billet (now the "Akeman Inn") and Plough and Anchor (now an Italian restaurant) pubs. It enters Oxfordshire and the district of Cherwell, and at Blackthorn it crosses the River Ray and meets a low bridge which was originally a  limit but due to bridge strikes, the road was lowered and the bridge now has a  limit.

Plans for an Aylesbury bypass exist and are well supported locally but no government decision has been made.

Bicester to Solihull 

The £5.7m  first stage of the Bicester bypass opened in November 1990, with the  £3.9m second stage (part of the A421 section to Wendlebury) opened in May 1993, and has many roundabouts. Since 1993, the road now heads south-west where it officially becomes part of the M40 at junction 9, meeting with the A34 (which also overlaps the M40 to Birmingham – to draw traffic off the previous routes). The former route went through Warwick. From here to the M42, the original route is now mainly designated as the B4100 (multiplexing at points with the current A361 and A422 through Banbury, plus the A452 and A425 approaching and through Warwick) followed by the A4177 and A4141, the latter two both excellent wide roads. At junction 5 of the M42, the A41 follows its old course. Further north, the road bypasses Solihull and goes through the city centres of Birmingham and Wolverhampton. This renumbering took place in 1991. The A4141 and B4100 are new designations, while the A4177 is an extension of an existing route.

Solihull to Wolverhampton 

The road manifests from the junction which opened in November 1976 with the A4141 and M42 near Berry Hall Farm (Picture), and crosses the River Blythe and bypasses Solihull. The former route through Solihull is now the B4025 and B425, which passes Solihull School. The A41 has a staggered junction with the B4102 (for Solihull and Catherine-de-Barnes) near the BUPA Parkway Hospital. At Lode Heath, there is crossroads with the B425 (for Solihull Hospital) where the road is the Seven Star Road. The A41 resumes the old route at another junction with the B425, becoming Warwick Road, which is the name of the route all the way into Birmingham. At Worlds End there is the Shell Solihull garage on the left. Next is Ulverley Green and it passes the BP Mereside garage on the right and passes under the Chiltern Main Line (for Leamington) near Olton station, Olton Library and Olton Reservoir. At the junction with the B4514, there is a Tesco petrol station and the road enters the city of Birmingham. The B4514 leads onto Olton Boulevard and can be used to bypass Acocks Green, although there is one section to be completed near Sparkhill. It passes Archbishop Ilsey RC School at Acocks Green, then meets the B4146 and B4217 at a roundabout near a Sainsburys. It meets the A4040 ring road at a staggered junction and crosses the Birmingham -Stratford Line near Tyseley station and the Tyseley Locomotive Works. At Sparkhill, it crosses the River Cole and meets the B4145 at a roundabout near Golden Hillock School. At Sparkbrook, it meets the A34 Stratford Road and there is a crossroads with the A4540 and B4126. The two main routes overlap around central Birmingham and meet The Middleway (A4540) inner ring road. The former route of the A41 through inner Birmingham is now the B4100 heading past the National Express Birmingham coach station, and passes near St Chad's RC Cathedral. The A41 previously resumed at Constitution Hill near Snow Hill train station but following downgrading of much of the former Inner Ring Road,  resumes in Hockley where it meets the northern section of the A4540. (The section from the A4540 to city centre is another part of the B4100). There is a staggered junction with the A4040 as the road passes through Handsworth (at this point known as Soho Road) which is a particular bottleneck with narrow lanes, on-street parking, bad drivers and several close-set junction, often very badly congested. Just before The Hawthorns football stadium, home of West Bromwich Albion F.C., it leaves Birmingham and enters the borough of Sandwell. It meets the M5 at junction 1, where it also meets the A4252.

In 2004, there were plans to re-route the road between Birmingham & West Bromwich along the current A457 via Smethwick & up to the M5 at Junction 1 along the current A4252. These plans were scrapped soon after. It bypasses West Bromwich on a dual-carriageway called the Expressway, which opened in 1973. There is a grade separated roundabout with the A4031 and the former route follows the A4196 from a roundabout. The grade separated roundabout opened over 20 years after the Expressway, relieving what had been a major bottleneck.

The new route opened in 1995 and is called the Black Country New Road, and crosses the West Midlands Metro tram near Guns Village. There is a roundabout with the B4149 at Swan Village. From the roundabout with the A461 (for Dudley) at Great Bridge, it overlaps the A461 (to Walsall), crosses the Tame Valley Canal, meets the A4037 at a roundabout and goes under the West Midlands Metro near Wednesbury Parkway tram stop. The A461 heads off to junction 9 of the M6 and Walsall. The A41 follows the old route from the next roundabout and enters the borough of Walsall. At the junction with the A4444 (the final phase of the Black Country New Road) it crosses the Walsall Canal.

There are junctions with the A4098 (where the road enters the borough of Wolverhampton) and B4163. The road goes straight through the middle of Bilston, where it meets the dual-carriageway A463 Black Country Route at a busy roundabout. Close by is the Bilston Central tram stop, near Morrisons. There is a junction with the B4484 (for the A454) near The Crescent tram stop. At Priestfield, it meets the B4162, and passes the City of Wolverhampton College Wellington Road Campus (Bilston) near Priestfield tram stop. From here, the West Midlands Metro runs down the centre of the road. There is a signalised junction with the A4126 (trams and buses use the nearside lane towards Wolverhampton) and the road passes under the Wolverhampton loop of the West Coast Main Line at Monmore Green, and crosses the Birmingham Canal. It overlaps the A4150 Wolverhampton Ring Road, then passes West Park Hospital and crosses the Staffordshire & Worcestershire Canal. It passes through Tettenhall, past Tettenhall College.

Wolverhampton to Newport 
After leaving the borough of Wolverhampton, it crosses the River Penk, then runs into Staffordshire passing Perton, Codsall and the golf course at Wrottesley Hall. Next is a junction with the A464 (for Shifnal), and the road enters Shropshire. It crosses the Wolverhampton to Shrewsbury Line on the Albrighton bypass. The road passes close by the RAF Museum at Cosford. After junction 3 of the M54 motorway, the road passes through Tong. The road meets the A5 at a roundabout, which is on the border with Staffordshire. At Weston Heath, there is a junction with the B5314. At the junction of the B4379, the road enters Telford and Wrekin. The  £6m Newport bypass opened in early 1985. The former route went through Chetwynd Aston. The A41 meets the A518 for Telford at a roundabout, followed by another roundabout with the A518 for travelling east, and then a roundabout with the A519 and the B5062.

Newport to Whitchurch 

The road rejoins the old route and passes Chetwynd Park. The £1.5m Hinstock Bypass opened in late 1983. The day before the bypass opened for traffic, a Hinstock local named David Williams flew his Saab 91D Safir airplane under the Pixley Lane bridge in an unsanctioned stunt. The road then passes through Standford, Standford Bridge and over the River Meese. It passes High Heath, Shakeford, Crickmery which is near Wistanswick. Nearby is the former wartime fighter base RAF Ternhill, now an army base known as Clive Barracks. The road crosses the River Tern, meets the A53 at a roundabout at Ternhill. The road passes through Prees Higher Heath near a former airfield (RAF Tilstock), and meets the A49 at a roundabout near Tilstock. The  £13.7m Whitchurch Bypass opened in July 1992, where the road meets the A49.

Whitchurch to Birkenhead 

The final stretch of the road leaves Shropshire and heads north through Cheshire on a modern alignment bypassing the villages of Tushingham cum Grindley and No Mans Heath before reaching a nineteenth century bypass of the stagecoach road through Broxton. The road crosses the A534 at Broxton Roundabout before passing Beeston, Bolesworth and Peckforton Castles. The road bypasses Chester, before running through the suburbs of Ellesmere Port (where the road was downgraded for safety reasons in the early 1990s). It heads to junction 5 of the M53 motorway and the Merseyside county boundary at Hooton. From this junction it is named New Chester Road, passing through Eastham and Bromborough. At Port Sunlight the A41 diverts onto a dual-carriageway section bypassing New Ferry and Rock Ferry before rejoining New Chester Road at Tranmere Oil Terminal. After passing Green Lane railway station, a  spur of the A41 separates at the southern approach to the Queensway Tunnel, which passes under the River Mersey and enters Liverpool to meet the start of the A59.

The road then passes a junction with the A554 near Hamilton Square railway station, terminating at the bus station at Woodside. The end of the road has views over the Mersey to Liverpool and transport links to Mersey Ferry services.

Major junctions

History of the road number 

The original (1923) route was Stanmore north-west of London to Oakengates, west of Wolverhampton, in Shropshire, meeting the A5 at both ends.

The A41 was extended by numbering as follows:

The northern extension dates from 1935; in Shropshire, it swapped with a combination of the A464/A529; from Kingswood Common to Nantwich, Cheshire and the original A529 ran from Hinstock to Chester. North of Chester, the A41 replaced part of the A51.

The southern extension dates from after the Second World War using Watford Way which opened in about 1930 as the A5088. In the remaining years after 1935, it was renumbered A500.

See also 

 Great Britain road numbering scheme
 Sparrows Herne Turnpike Road
 Wirral Line

Notes

References

External links 

 BBC News – Village gets bypass after 40 years – 03/10/2003
 Highways Agency – Aston Clinton scheme page.
 CBRD – Futures – A41 Aston Clinton Bypass.
 Pathetic Motorways – A41(M)

Roads in England
Roads in Cheshire
Transport in Birmingham, West Midlands
Roads in Buckinghamshire
Roads in Hertfordshire
Roads in London
Roads in Merseyside
Roads in Oxfordshire
Roads in Shropshire
Roads in the West Midlands (county)
Transport in Wolverhampton
Transport in Sandwell
Transport in Staffordshire
Transport in Walsall
Newport, Shropshire
Transport in the Metropolitan Borough of Wirral